The Lasallian Schools Press Conference (more known as LSPCon) is an annual event that convenes all student journalists from the member institutions of De La Salle Philippines for seminars and workshops on journalism with speakers from the Philippine media industry.

Topics include news writing, features writing, sports writing, opinion writing, creative writing, newspaper layout, editing, photojournalism, and illustration for newspapers and magazines.

It is organized by the Alliance of Lasallian Campus Journalists, a union of all student publications within the system, along with a host school chosen from the member schools.

LSPCon 2015
De La Salle Araneta University hosted the LSPCON 2015.

LSPCon 2013

The University of St. La Salle hosted the LSPCON 2013.

LSPCon 2012

De La Salle-College of Saint Benilde played host to the 2012 Lasallian Schools Press Conference.

LSPCon 2011

The Lasallian Schools Press Conference went back to its birthplace when De La Salle University-Manila hosted it in 2011. 
 The poster used to promote the Lasallian Schools Press Conference held at De La Salle University in Manila featured landmarks in Manila and invited the participants to rediscover this exciting city.

LSPCon 2010

De La Salle Lipa welcomed all Lasallian campus journalists to the 2010 Lasallian Schools Press Conference.

LSPCon 2009

This year’s overarching theme is Environmental Journalism: A Heart of Change. This year's LSPCon was held at De La Salle-Araneta University.

LSPCon 2008

The University of Saint La Salle in Bacolod went all out to welcome all Lasallian campus journalists for the annual Lasallian Schools Press Conference.

LSPCon 2007

The LSPCon 2007 was held on May 3–5, 2007 at De La Salle University-Dasmariñas.

The Alliance of Lasallian Campus Journalists and Advisers was launched during this momentous gathering.

Its theme was "Lasallian Campus Journalist: Exercising rights, taking responsibility, valuing ethics." Its speakers included The Philippine Star's Rene Aranda, the Philippine Daily Inquirer's Isagani Yambot, and Vim Nadera, among others.
The Official LSPCon 2007 Blog

LSPCon 2006

The Student Publications Office of De La Salle-College of Saint Benilde expanded the one-day seminar into three when it hosted the Lasallian Schools Press Conference, a yearly event that convenes all the Lasallian campus journalists for seminars and workshops with topnotch speakers.

Carrying the theme, "Defining Lasallian journalism towards empowering the nation," LSPCon 2006 featured notable speakers such as Manuel Luis Quezon III, Jun Barrameda, Rowena Paraan, and Conrado de Quiros, among many others.
Quasi-life – an image gallery of LSPCon 2006

LSPCon 2005

De La Salle University-Manila hosted the first-ever Lasallian Schools Press Conference.

References

Lasallian student publications
Conferences